Luis Humberto Castro Dinamarca (born 21 September 1957), also known by his nickname Cholo Castro, is a Chilean former footballer who played as a forward for clubs in Chile and Mexico.

Career
In his homeland, Castro played for Fernández Vial and Naval in the Chilean top division. In addition, as a member of Fernández Vial, he won the league titles of both the Tercera División and the Segunda División in 1981 and 1982, respectively, and took part in the first  against Deportes Concepción at professional level in 1982.

In 1987, he emigrated to Mexico and joined Atlético Potosino in the Mexican top division, where he coincided with his compatriots Nelson Sanhueza as fellow and Pedro Araya as coach. He scored two goals in the 1987–88 season.

At international level, he represented the Chile national B team and won the Indonesian Independence Cup in 1985, alongside players such as Oscar Wirth, Fernando Astengo, Carlos Poblete, among others.

Personal life
He made his home in Potosí, Mexico, and has taken part in local amateur championships of the Liga de Veteranos (Veteran League).

Honours
Fernández Vial
 Tercera División de Chile: 
 Segunda División de Chile: 1982

Chile B
 Indonesian Independence Cup: 1985

References

1957 births
Living people
Chilean footballers
Chilean expatriate footballers
Chile international footballers
C.D. Arturo Fernández Vial footballers
Naval de Talcahuano footballers
Tercera División de Chile players
Primera B de Chile players
Chilean Primera División players
Atlético Potosino footballers
Liga MX players
Chilean expatriate sportspeople in Mexico
Expatriate footballers in Mexico
Association football forwards
Place of birth missing (living people)